Nvidia NVDEC (formerly known as NVCUVID) is a feature in its graphics cards that performs video decoding, offloading this compute-intensive task from the CPU.

It is accompanied by NVENC for video encoding in Nvidia's Video Codec SDK.

Technology 
NVDEC can offload video decoding to full fixed-function decoding hardware (Nvidia PureVideo), or (partially) decode via CUDA software running on the GPU, if fixed-function hardware is not available.

Depending on the GPU architecture, the following codecs are supported:
 MPEG-2
 VC-1
 H.264 (AVC)
 H.265 (HEVC)
 VP8
 VP9
 AV1

Versions 

NVCUVID was originally distributed as part of the Nvidia CUDA Toolkit. Later, it was renamed to NVDEC and moved to the Nvidia Video Codec SDK.

Operating system support 

NVDEC is available for Windows and Linux operating systems. As NVDEC is a proprietary API (as opposed to the open-source VDPAU API), it is only supported by the proprietary Nvidia driver on Linux.

Application and library support 
 Gstreamer has supported NVDEC since 2017.
 FFmpeg has supported NVDEC since 2017.
 mpv has supported NVDEC since 2017 by the use of FFmpeg.

GPU support 
HW accelerated decode and encode are supported on Nvidia GeForce, Quadro, Tesla, and GRID products with Fermi or newer generation GPUs.

See also 
 AMD Video Core Next, AMD's equivalent SIP core since 2018
 AMD Unified Video Decoder, AMD's equivalent SIP core up to 2017
 Intel Quick Sync Video, Intel's equivalent SIP core
List of Nvidia graphics processing units
Qualcomm Hexagon
Nvidia NVENC

References

External links 
 NVIDIA VIDEO CODEC SDK

Nvidia IP cores
Video acceleration
Video compression and decompression ASIC
Hardware_acceleration